Ishasha is a town in the Democratic Republic of the Congo (DRC). The town sits across the Ishasha River, which acts as the international border, from the much smaller Ishasha Border Post, in neighboring Uganda. This town has seen much human translocations during the last decade of the 20th century and the first 20 years of the 21 century, as a result of refugees fleeing the two Congo Wars and the associated subsequent armed militia conflicts.

Location
Ishasha is located in Rutshuru Territory, one of the administrative divisions of North Kivu Province.

The geographical coordinates of Ishasha, DRC are 0°44'27.0"S, 29°37'24.0"E (Latitude:-0.740833; Longitude:29.623333).

Overview
The communities around the town of Ishasha, DRC have suffered multiple dislocations during the last 30 years, starting with the First Congo War in the late 1990s, followed by the Second Congo War in the early 2000s and the subsequent cavil unrest in the eastern part of the country, as a result of multiple armed insurgencies and insurrections.

Other considerations
To the immediate north of Ishasha, DRC is the Virunga National Park, and adjacent to that, across the Ishasha River, is Queen Elizabeth National Park in Uganda. The area benefits from tourist activity but personal safety concerns persist.

See also
 Ishasha, Uganda

References

External links
 About Virunga National Park
 DRC authorities accuse Ugandans of diverting boundary As of 12 March 2021.

Populated places in North Kivu
 Cities in the Great Rift Valley
Democratic Republic of the Congo–Uganda border crossings
Democratic Republic of the Congo–Uganda relations